Alfredo Rampi, nicknamed Alfredino (little Alfredo) (April 11, 1975 – June 13, 1981), was an Italian child who died after falling into a well in Vermicino, a village near Frascati, on 10 June 1981.

The incident
Around 19:00 on 10 June 1981, Alfredo was a 6 year-old boy out on a walk with his family. When the family decided to return home, he asked his parents if he could walk alone and as the child wandered by himself he fell into an artesian well which was very narrow and deep (about 30 cm wide and 80 m deep). His position, on arrival of the first rescuers, was estimated at around 36 m below ground level.

The first rescuers were the local firefighters, who initially tried to lower a simple tablet attached to a rope. The hope was that Alfredo could grab the tablet and hold on to it as the men would pull him out. However, the tablet got stuck before it could reach the child and they weren't even able to pull back out said object because the rope tore. Next, 3 speleologists tried to lower themselves into the well upside-down attempting to at least remove the tablet, but all failed because the passage was too narrow for an adult to go that deep.

As time was passing, commander of the Rome fire department Elveno Pastorelli ordered everyone to ignore the tablet and concentrate on digging up a wider, parallel shaft beside the well.
The plan was to bore a tunnel as deep as 40m and then a connecting horizontal corridor that would allow rescuers to reach the boy from below.
Efforts intensified and heavy machinery was brought to the site but unfortunately the drilling caused the boy to slip an estimated 30m further down the well. This is because at certain depths there were layers of hard rock that required the use of extreme impact tools, thus shaking the entire area. The parallel tunnel was only 3m away from the well.

The drama caused unprecedented media attention, as the live broadcast on television went on for 18 hours nonstop. RAI, Italian public television, recorded audiences of 21 million people at peak times. The Italian President at the time, Sandro Pertini, personally visited the scene.

As rescue attempts became more desperate, Angelo Licheri, a volunteer, was secured and lowered into the well to try to save Alfredo. He did manage to reach him and tried to secure a harness around him to pull him out, but failed. Dramatically, none of the further attempts to save him had success; in fact, he only slipped down lower and lower. Licheri was upside down in the well for 45 minutes and never completely recovered from the injuries caused by the descent.

After many hours, Alfredo's voice (relayed by a microphone) was getting weaker and he is thought to have died around 6:30 on 13 June 1981. Another volunteer, Donato Caruso, realized that he was dead while trying once again to secure a harness on him. His body was finally recovered on 11 July, a month after his death.

Subsequently, Alfredo's mother, Franca Rampi, founded the "Rampi Center" that helps and encourages the civil protection of children.

Media furor 
The attempted rescue was a major media event. It was the first time in Italy that a live outside broadcast had attracted millions of people to follow the events on TV. Initially, images were transmitted live because it was believed that there would be a quick and positive outcome. After some time the situation appeared to be slowly worsening, but it was too late to interrupt the transmissions. It posed many questions about privacy and the ethics of broadcasting such events which sparked a widespread public debate. The story also made the international news, a BBC Headlines broadcast carrying the story of a rescue attempt as its top headline on 12 June.

Lasting impact
Italian alternative rock band Baustelle wrote a song about the tragedy. The song, "Alfredo", is track 10 on their 2008 album Amen. Among other prizes, Amen won that year's "Targa Tenco", one of the most prestigious music acknowledgments in Italy.

See also 
 Kathy Fiscus
 Jessica McClure
 Julen Roselló
 Rayan Oram (2016 or 2017–2022), a Moroccan child who fell into a well and died

References

External links 

 Today in History: June 10 MSNBC article mentioning the story
 "Too Deep" article in The American Magazine

1975 births
1981 deaths
1981 in Italy
Accidental deaths from falls
Accidental deaths in Italy
Italian children
People from Frascati
Cases of people who fell into a well
Child deaths